Asynarchus is a genus of insects belonging to the family Limnephilidae.

The genus was first described by McLachlan in 1880.

The species of this genus are found in Eurasia and Northern America.

Species:
 Asynarchus contumax McLachlan, 1880

References

Limnephilidae
Trichoptera genera
Insects of Europe
Insects of Asia
Insects of North America